The Royal Canadian Geographical Society (RCGS; French: Société géographique royale du Canada) is a Canadian nonprofit educational organization dedicated to imparting a broader knowledge and deeper appreciation of Canada—its people and places, its natural and cultural heritage, and its environmental, social and economic challenges.

History
The Royal Canadian Geographical Society was founded in 1929 by a group of eminent Canadians, including Marius Barbeau, an ethnographer and folklorist who is today considered a founder of Canadian anthropology, the Hon. A.E. Arsenault, Premier of Prince Edward Island and justice of the province's supreme court, Lawrence J. Burpee, Secretary for Canada of the International Joint Commission, John Wesley Dafoe, managing editor of the Winnipeg Free Press, the Hon. Albert Hudson, a justice of the Supreme Court of Canada, and Dr. O.D. Skelton, Under-Secretary of State for External Affairs.

The Rt. Hon. Viscount Willingdon, Governor-General of Canada, was the founding patron. J.B. Joseph Tyrrell, a geologist and cartographer whose exploits included the discovery of Albertosaurus bones in Alberta's Badlands, and making first contact with the Ihalmiut ("People from Beyond") of the Keewatin district of Canada's Northwest Territories, served as founding Honorary President. Arthur Philemon Coleman, a geologist and explorer who between 1884 and 1908 made eight trips of discovery to the Canadian Rockies, was named Honorary Vice-President.

At its first meeting, Charles Camsell said the society was formed "purely for patriotic purposes", and he hoped it would "be a unifying influence upon the life of Canada." A report by the acting secretary, E.S. Martindale, stated the intention of the founders: "The work of making the resources and other geographic factors of each part of the Dominion more widely known and more clearly understood is one of the best educational services that can be undertaken—and one that cannot be rendered except through a geographic organization animated by a broad national purpose."

Among those who have addressed meetings of the RCGS over the years are Sir Francis Younghusband, Sir Hubert Wilkins, Maj. L.T. Burwash, Dr. Isaiah Bowman, Dr. Wade Davis, Michael Palin, Dr. Phil Currie, and Sir Christopher Ondaatje.

The RCGS publishes an award-winning English-language magazine, Canadian Geographic, which has been published continuously since 1930 (then called Canadian Geographical Journal). The society also publishes Canadian Geographic Travel quarterly. The society's French-language magazine, Géographica, which is published in collaboration with La Presse, was introduced in 1997.

Alan Beddoe designed the coat of arms for the Royal Canadian Geographical Society, and his fonds includes a black and white photograph of the letters patent.

In October 2016, it was announced that the society's new home would be an "iconic" building at 50 Sussex Drive in Ottawa. The society moved into its new headquarters in Spring 2018, and it debuted two exhibitions – Explore by Chris Cran and Lessons From the Arctic: How Roald Amundsen Won the Race to the South Pole.

In May 2019, the prime minister of Canada, Justin Trudeau, attended the official opening ceremony of the Royal Canadian Geographical Society's headquarters at 50 Sussex Drive.

Programs
The Royal Canadian Geographical Society helps fund education, expeditions, research and lectures programs. Notably, it was a partner in the 2014 Victoria Strait Expedition that located HMS Erebus, one of two exploration vessels lost on the British Arctic Expedition led by Sir John Franklin.

Each fall, the society hosts the annual College of Fellows Annual Dinner, with notable past speakers include Sir Francis Younghusband, Major General Sir James Howden MacBrien, Jeopardy! host Alex Trebek, artist Robert Bateman, actor Dan Aykroyd, ethnobotanist Wade Davis, Climate Canada's senior climatologist David Phillips, storm chaser George Kourounis, and award-winning author Margaret Atwood. In addition, the dinner has been attended by both Prime Minister Stephen Harper and Governor General David Johnston in the past.

In June 2017, it was granted $2,084,000 in funding from the Government of Canada to develop the educational resource, a portion of which was drawn from the Canada 150 fund. This resulted in the creation of the Indigenous Peoples Atlas of Canada, developed with input from a number of groups and organizations representing indigenous peoples in Canada, including the Assembly of First Nations, Indspire, Inuit Tapiriit Kanatami, the Métis National Council, and the National Centre for Truth and Reconciliation.  An issue of each of Canadian Geographic and Géographica were dedicated to the project.

College of Fellows

The society's board of governors and its program committees are made up entirely of volunteers, who are members of the College of Fellows. Traditionally, Fellows were elected "in recognition of outstanding service to Canada." Fellows are entitled to use the post-nominal letters FRCGS (Fellow of the Royal Canadian Geographical Society).

Past Fellows of the society include eminent names such as:
 painter A.Y. Jackson, 
 explorer Vilhjalmur Stefansson, 
 mariner and explorer Capt. Joseph-Elzéar Bernier, 
 journalist Agnes C. Laut, 
 American businessman and explorer Fenley Hunter, 
 Nobel Prize recipient Prof. F.G. Banting, 
 Edward Shackleton, Baron Shackleton, geographer and son of Sir Ernest Shackleton, 
 composer Sir Ernest MacMillan, 
 broadcaster and traveller Lowell Thomas, 
 businessman James Armstrong Richardson Sr., 
 Saskatchewan Premier T.C. Tommy Douglas, 
 explorer Henry Larsen, 
 historian L'abbé Arthur Maheux
 anthropologist Diamond Jenness,
 businessman E.P. Taylor, 
 Canadian Prime Ministers R.B. Bennett, Louis St. Laurent, and Lester B. Pearson, 
 hotelier Conrad Hilton, 
 former Conservative leader and Nova Scotia Premier Robert Stanfield, 
 and geographer and GIS originator Roger Tomlinson.

Current Fellows include:
 Gilbert M. Grosvenor, of the National Geographic Society, 
 ethnobotanist Wade Davis, 
 astronauts Steve MacLean, Jeremy Hansen and Jerry M. Linenger, 
 and businessman and author Sir Christopher Ondaatje.

Besides regular Fellows, the society elects Honorary Fellows, people recognized for special or outstanding achievements. The president, and other members of the executive, are elected by the College of Fellows at the society's annual general meeting.

Honorary Fellows include:
 Myrna Pearman, Canadian naturalist and author.

Organization
The Governor General of Canada serves as the patron of the society. The society has honorary officers, including honorary presidents and honorary vice-presidents. A volunteer Board of governors, chaired by the president of the board, and an executive committee, provide general oversight.

Day-to-day operations of the society, its programs and business, are provided by its chief executive officer, currently John G. Geiger. The CEO is also responsible for strategic leadership, in consultation with the board of governors.

Presidents 
1930–1941: Dr. Charles Camsell, geologist in charge of explorations for the Geological Survey of Canada, and commissioner of the Northwest Territories. Oversaw the exploration of the uncharted parts of Canada's North—a vast area covering 1.4 million square kilometres or about 25 percent of the country. 
1941–1944: Dr. George J. Desbarats, Deputy Minister of Marine and Fisheries and of National Defence. He was the Canadian official who first learned that explorer Vilhjalmur Stefansson was separated from his ship, and that the Karluk was missing in the Arctic ice. 
1944–1950: Mr. Charles C. Cowan, vice president and managing director, British American Bank Note Co.; Dir., National Film Board
1950–1955: Air Marshal Robert Leckie, an aviation pioneer and Chief of the Air Staff for the Royal Canadian Air Force. An outstanding fighter pilot during the First World War, he flew attacks on German Zeppelins, and downed two. 
1955–1963: Maj.-Gen. Hugh A. Young, commanded the 6th Canadian Infantry Brigade at Normandy, and served as Deputy Minister of Public Works. Commissioner of the Northwest Territories from 1950 to 1953. As head of the advisory committee on Northern Development, in 1953 he studied threats to Canadian sovereignty in the Arctic. 
1963–1967: Dr. Omond Solandt, scientist and first chairman of both Canada's Defence Research Board and the Science Council of Canada. He was a scientific advisor to Lord Louis Mountbatten, the last Viceroy of India, and later a member of the joint military mission sent to Japan to evaluate the effects of the atomic bomb. He served as Chancellor of the University of Toronto.
1967–1977: Dr. Pierre Camu, geographer and civil servant. Served as president of the St. Lawrence Seaway Authority, and later as chair of the Canadian Radio-television and Telecommunications Commission (CRTC). He is co-founder of the Trans Canada Trail. 
1977–1986: Mr. Denis Coolican, served as president of the Canadian Bank Note Company and the first Chair of the Regional Municipality of Ottawa-Carleton. He was also a Vice President of Brascan.
1986–1992: Dr. Alexander T. Davidson, geographer and civil servant. Served as chief of resources for the federal Department of Northern Affairs, and assistant deputy minister of rural development; water; policy, planning and research for Environment Canada; and Parks Canada. He also was chairman of the federal Panel Concerning Low Level Military Flights in Labrador-Goose Bay. 
1992–1998: Dr. Denis A. St-Onge, geoscientist with the Geological Survey of Canada. Conducted pioneering research into the evolution of landscape under extreme cold climate on Ellef Ringnes Island in the High Arctic. He is credited with developing a unique method of mapping geomorphology. 
1998–2004: Dr. Arthur E. Collin, served as Scientific Advisor for the Maritime Forces (1965) and as the Dominion Hydrographer (1968).  From 1971 to 1980 he served as Assistant Deputy Minister of Fisheries and Oceans and the Environment.  
2004–2010: Ms Gisèle Jacob, director general with Environment Canada and Deputy Secretary General for the Canadian Human Rights Commission. She also served as chair of the Geographical Names Board of Canada. 
2010–2013: Mr. John G. Geiger, author of Frozen In Time: The Fate of The Franklin Expedition and other books, former head of the editorial board of The Globe and Mail, current chief executive officer of the RCGS.
2013–2016: Dr. Paul Ruest, former president of the Université de Saint-Boniface.
2016–present: Mr. Gavin Fitch, QC, lawyer.

Notable Vice-Presidents 
1930–1934: J. Mackintosh Bell, geologist, explorer and writer. His field work included pioneer exploration in Arctic Canada for the Geological Survey of Canada. He later became director of the Geological Survey of New Zealand.
1939–1941: Senator W. A. Buchanan, former Member of Parliament and publisher of the Lethbridge Herald.
1939–1954: Gen. A.G.L. Andrew McNaughton, Chief of the General Staff for Canada, commanding officer of the First Canadian Infantry Division, First Canadian Corps, First Canadian Army, Minister of National Defense, and Ambassador to the United Nations.
1968–Dr. John Tuzo Wilson, geophysicist and geologist who achieved worldwide acclaim for his contributions to the theory of plate tectonics.
1988-2000: Ernest Côté, soldier, diplomat, and senior civil servant.

Awards

Gold Medal 
Recognizing a particular achievement by one or more individuals in the general field of geography or a significant national or international event. It was first awarded in 1972.

Source: RCGS
2019: Adrienne Clarkson and Dr. Jane Goodall 
2018: Trans Canada Trail, Perry Bellegarde, Clément Chartier, Natan Obed, Ry Moran and Roberta Jamieson
2017: Sir David Attenborough, Gordon Lightfoot (singer/songwriter) and John Turner (Prime Minister)
2016: Marc R. St-Onge, Paul F. Hoffman, Denis St-Onge and the Geological Survey of Canada
2015: Jacob Verhoef, Graeme Gibson and Margaret Atwood
2014: Canada's Astronauts, including Roberta Bondar, David Saint-Jacques, Marc Garneau, Steve MacLean, Dafydd Rhys "Dave" Williams, Robert Thirsk, Jeremy Hansen, Bjarni Tryggvason and the Canadian Space Agency
2013: Michael Palin, Robert Bateman, and Yvan Desy and Sylvain Lemay of Natural Resources Canada
2012: Dr. Philip Currie
2011: Sir Christopher Ondaatje and Dr. Jerry Linenger 
2010: Alex Trebek and Canadian International Polar Year National Committee 
2009: Dr. Wade Davis
2007: The Nature of Québec/Le Québec au naturel 
2006: The Atlas of Canada 
2004: Jean Lemire and Edryd Shaw
2003: Roger F. Tomlinson
2002: Gordon Slade
2001: Norman Hallendy
2000: Bernard Voyer
1998: Mary Simon
1997: Peter Gzowski
1996: Gilbert M. Grosvenor
1995: Harold K. Eidsvik, Dr. Lawrence W. Morley and Dr. Victor K. Prest
1994: The Historical Atlas of Canada, volumes II and III
1988: The Historical Atlas of Canada, Volume I, William G. Dean, Richard Colebrook Harris, and Geoffrey J. Matthews
1986: Dr. Derek C. Ford
1980: Selma Barkham
1978: Dr. J. Tuzo Wilson
1976: National Atlas of Canada
1973: Maj. Gen. William J. Megill
1972: Dr. Stanislaw Lesczychki

Sir Christopher Ondaatje Medal for Exploration 
The Sir Christopher Ondaatje Medal for Exploration, named after Gold Medal and Camsell Medal recipient Sir Christopher Ondaatje, was established in 2013.

Source: RCGS
2019: Charles “Chas” Yonge
2018: Chic Scott
2017: Pat and Baiba Morrow, and Wade Davis 
2016: Richard Weber
2015: Jean Lemire 
2014: George Hobson
2013: Jill Heinerth

3M Environmental Innovation Award 
The 3M Environmental Innovation Award was established in 2009 by the Society and 3M Canada to recognize outstanding individuals in business, government, academia or community organizations whose innovative contributions to environmental change are benefiting Canada and Canadians. The award was discontinued, with the final recipient named in 2015.

Source: RCGS
2015: GreenBug Energy Inc.
2014: Ross Thurston
2013: Jeff Golfman
2012: Dr. Fraser Taylor
2011: Michel Séguin
2010: Frank van Biesen
2009: Sidney Ribaux

Camsell Medal 
The Royal Canadian Geographical Society awards the Camsell Medal to bestow recognition upon, and to express the society's appreciation to, individuals who have given outstanding service to the society. The award was established by the society's board of governors in 1992.

Source: RCGS
2018: Paul Ruest and Élisabeth Nadeau
2017: Jody Decker and Philip Howarth
2016: Mark Graham, Peter Harrison and Christine Duverger-Harrison
2015: Bruce Amos and Louise Maffett
2014: Christopher Burn and Iain Wallace
2013: Sir Christopher Ondaatje
2012: Jean Fournier
2011: Gisèle Jacob and Arthur E. Collin
2010: Pierre Bergeron and Helen Kerfoot
2009: James Raffan and Ted Johnson
2008: Kenneth Boland and Carman Joynt
2007: Stuart Semple and Brian Osborne
2006: Karen Lochhead and Michael Schmidt
2005: James Maxwell and Denis St-Onge 
2004: Samuel P. Arsenault and Alexander T. Davidson
2003: J. Blair Seaborn and David Kirkwood
2002: Alan O. Gibbons
2001: Dickson Mansfield
2000: Winifred Wadasinghe-Wijay
1999: Pierre Camu and Grete Hale 
1998: Pierre Des Marais II and Dr. George Hobson 
1997: Enid Byford  and Robert Goddard  
1996: David Bartlett
1995: William M. Gilchrist and Col. Louis M. Sebert 
1994: Wendy Simpson-Lewis
1993: David W. Phillips and Dr. Ernest P. Weeks 
1992: Dr. J. Keith Fraser and Samuel F. Hughes

The Martin Bergmann Medal for Excellence in Arctic Leadership and Science
Established by the Royal Canadian Geographical Society in 2012, the medal recognizes achievement for "excellence in Arctic leadership and science." It is named in honour of Martin "Marty" Bergmann, a public servant.

Source: RCGS
2018: James Drummond and Derek Muir 
2017: Martin Fortier 
2016: Warwick Vincent
2015: John Smol
2014: Donald Forbes
2013: David Hik
2012: Martin Bergmann

Lawrence J. Burpee Medal
Established by the society in 2013, this medal is awarded to recognize outstanding contribution to the general advancement of geography, or to other achievement that greatly enhances the ability of the society to fulfill its mission.

Source: RCGS
2019: Brian May (of "Queen")
2018: Chris Cran, André Préfontaine and Peter Suedfeld 
2017: President  Jimmy Carter and Andrew Prossin
2016: Simon Winchester
2015: Louie Kamookak, Wendy Cecil and Alex Trebek
2014: Marc-André Bernier, Ryan Harris, Jonathan Moore and Andrew Campbell (Parks Canada)

Massey Medal 
The Massey Medal recognizes outstanding personal achievement in the exploration, development or description of the geography of Canada. The award was established in 1959 by the Massey Foundation, named for industrialist Hart Massey.

Source: RCGS
 2018: Arthur J. Ray
 2017: David Morrison
 2016: Steve Blasco
 2015: Brian Osborne
 2014: Derald Smith
 2013: David Ley
 2012: Graeme Wynn
 2011: David Livingstone
 2010: Raymond Price
 2009: Michael Church
 2008: Bruce Mitchell
 2007: Eddy Carmack
 2006: Serge Courville
 2005: Tim Oke
 2004: Larry Stuart Bourne
 2003: Richard Colebrook Harris
 2002: John Oliver Wheeler
 2001: Lawrence McCann
 1999: Alexander T. Davidson
 1998: William C. Wonders
 1997: James A. Houston
 1996: James P. Bruce
 1995: Pierre Camu

Innovation in Geography Teaching Award
Established in 2013, the Innovation in Geography Teaching Award is presented to K-12 teachers who have "gone above and beyond their job description to further geographic literacy." Recipients are chosen by the board of Canadian Geographic Education.

Source: RCGS
2018: Breanna Heels
2017: Paula Huddy-Zubkowski
2016: Greg Neil
2015: Janet Ruest
2014: Mike Farley
2013: Andrew Young

Louie Kamookak Medal
Established in 2018, the medal is named for Louie Kamookak, an Inuit historian involved in the search for Franklin's lost expedition, and is awarded for those who have "been brought to the attention of the Executive Committee, Awards Committee, or to the CEO, as having made Canada’s geography better known to Canadians and to the world".

Source: RCGS
2020: Nellie Kusugak, Elizabeth Dowdeswell
2019: George Jacob
2018: Gregory Copley, Jared Harris, Josephine Kamookak, Anne Kari Hansen Ovind, Michael Palin, Kim Wallace

Canadian Geographic Education
Canadian Geographic Education—formerly the Canadian Council for Geographic Education (CCGE)—is a joint initiative of the Royal Canadian Geographical Society and the National Geographic Society of Washington, D.C., established in 1993. The programs of the Can Geo Education aim to strengthen geographic education in the classroom. In addition to increasing the emphasis on geography within the school system, the Can Geo Education endeavours to increase the public awareness of the importance of geographical literacy.

See also
 Canadian Association of Geographers
 List of Canadian organizations with royal patronage
 List of environmental awards
 List of geography awards

References

External links

 
 Canadian Geographic magazine
 Géographica magazine
 Canadian Geographic Education

 
Geography of Canada
Geographic societies
Educational organizations based in Ontario
Organizations based in Canada with royal patronage
1929 establishments in Ontario
Organizations established in 1929
Learned societies of Canada